Ye Nyunt (born 3 June 1950) is a Burmese former footballer. He competed in the men's tournament at the 1972 Summer Olympics.

Honours

Burma
 Asian Games Gold medal: 1970
 AFC Asian Cup runner-up: 1968
 King's Cup runner-up: 1968

References

External links
 

1950 births
Living people
Burmese footballers
Myanmar international footballers
Olympic footballers of Myanmar
Footballers at the 1972 Summer Olympics
Place of birth missing (living people)
Association football midfielders
Competitors at the 1967 Southeast Asian Peninsular Games
1968 AFC Asian Cup players
Southeast Asian Games gold medalists for Myanmar
Southeast Asian Games medalists in football
Footballers at the 1970 Asian Games
Footballers at the 1974 Asian Games
Medalists at the 1970 Asian Games
Asian Games medalists in football
Asian Games gold medalists for Myanmar